Federal Government Girls College, Oyo is a Federal Government owned secondary school, run by the Federal Ministry of Education. It is an all girls' secondary school situated on Owinni Hill, Sabo area, Oyo State, Nigeria.

History 
Federal Government Girls College, Oyo was founded in 1995.

References 

Secondary schools in Nigeria
Government schools in Nigeria